Epitoxis albicincta is a moth of the subfamily Arctiinae. It was described by George Hampson in 1903. It is found in the Democratic Republic of the Congo, Kenya, Tanzania and Uganda.

References

 

Arctiinae
Moths described in 1903